Oplometa is a genus of moths in the family Lasiocampidae. The genus was erected by Per Olof Christopher Aurivillius in 1894.

Species
Oplometa cassandra (Druce, 1887)
Oplometa cornuta Aurivillius, 1894

References

Lasiocampidae